Watchmen Recording Studios is a music recording facility owned and operated by Doug White, located in Lockport, New York, U.S. The studio opened to the public in 1995, and as of 2013 over 4,000 bands and artists have recorded at the location. These include regional and national acts such as Gym Class Heroes, Psyopus, The Bunny The Bear, and Brutal Truth, as well as labels such as Relapse Records, Victory Records, Metal Blade Records, Willowtip Records and Century Media Records.

History

Founding by Doug White
Watchmen Studios was founded by musician and producer Doug White in 1989, after he returned home to Western New York from The Art Institute of Atlanta with an associate degree in Audio Engineering and Music Management.

The studio originated in White's parent's basement, where he and his band mates at the time built a small facility to do their own recording. White's band's name was the Watchmen, a reference to the Alan Moore comics. Because only his band was recording at the time, the studio itself inherited the name. A few years later the business went commercial as Watchmen Studios and the name stuck.

The Watchmen disbanded with some members going on to form Snapcase, while White stayed on with recording, building up a base of clients. In 1995 he moved the studio permanently into a commercial building in Lockport, creating a small eight room studio.

Releases
The band Lemuria recorded all their albums as of 2008 in the studio, including 2007's Get Better.

Doug White was given two awards from the RIAA for 1,000,000 copies sold for the single "Cupid's Chokehold" by the band Gym Class Heroes. The other award presented to White was for 500,000 copies sold of the Gym Class Hero's album As Cruel as School Children (2006). White also produced the debut album ...For the Kids for the Gym Class Heroes.

As of 2013, over 4000 bands and artists have recorded at the location. These include small regional acts and larger names such as Gym Class Heroes, Psyopus, The Bunny The Bear, Brutal Truth, as well as working with labels such as Relapse Records, Victory Records, Metal Blade Records, and Century Media Records. White notes: "Working with many different types of budgets has been the key for Watchmen Studios, big or small, turning out consistent product for many years."

Associated bands
Tearwave was Doug White's next band, and they've been associated with the label since their founding. They were signed to Projekt Records, which is owned by Sam Rosenthal.  Tearwave released two albums under Projekt Records, the first (in 2007) was self-titled and the second release (2008) was titled A Different Shade of Beauty. Tearwave was disbanded in 2009.

In an interview with The Apparatus, Doug talks about Tearwave: 

After Tearwave disintegrated Doug White assembled Makaras Pen, also signed to Projekt Records. In 2010 they released a self-titled debut album, followed in 2011 by A Petal Among Bricks. With a consistent shoegaze and dream pop sound, the band continues to record music and create music videos.

Studio equipment
As of September 2013, the following equipment is in use at the studio:

Allen & Heath 32X8 Bus Console
HDR 24/96 Mackie Hard Drive Digital Editor
ADAT XT-20 24 Track
Effects
Lexicon Reverb
Zoom Effects
DOD effects
Alesis Effects
Ashley Compression
DBX 266+166 Compression
Peavey Compression
PreSonus Compression
TC Electronics

Mics and Preamps
Allen & Heath (Neve Modeled)
Preonus
AKG Mics
Sennheiser Mics
Sure Mics
York Mics

Amps/Guitars
Mesa Boogie Triple Rectifier and Cab
Marshall Valve State 100 and Cab
Orange 50 Watt
Trace Elliot and Cab
Fender Deluxe Deville
Custom Les Paul
Paul Reed Smith Ten Top Custom
Acoustic Martin
Ibanez Electric- R6550
EBO
Full line of BOSS Pedals

Headphones
Sony Headphones
AKG Headphones
Full Soundforge Mastering
Steinburg Plugins
Melodyne Vocal Correction
Pro Tools L.E.

Studio gallery
The following photographs of the inside of the studio were taken in 2008.

Discography

References

External links

 
Recording studios in New York (state)